Windham Manor was a manor house in Norfolk, England. It was owned by the Southwell family and was the birthplace of Richard Southwell and Robert Southwell.

References

See also
Felbrigg Hall 

Tudor England
Country houses in Norfolk